Burgruine Himmelberg is a castle in Carinthia, Austria. The castle gave the town of Himmelberg its name.

See also 
List of castles in Austria

References 
This article was initially translated from the German Wikipedia.

Castles in Carinthia (state)